The Wisconsin Court of Appeals is an intermediate appellate court that reviews contested decisions of the Wisconsin circuit courts.  The Court of Appeals was created in August 1978 to alleviate the Wisconsin Supreme Court's rising number of appellate cases.  Published Court of Appeals opinions are considered binding precedent until overruled by the Supreme Court; unpublished opinions are not.  The Court hears most appeals in three-judge panels, but appeals of circuit court decisions in misdemeanor, small claims, and municipal ordinance cases are decided by a single judge.

Composition
The Court of Appeals comprises 16 judges elected to six-year terms in four geographic districts.  Districts I and II have four judges each, three judges are chambered in District III, and five in District IV.  The court is administered by a chief judge, appointed by the Wisconsin Supreme Court, who is assisted by a deputy chief judge and a presiding judge in each district.  Vacancies on the court are filled by gubernatorial appointment; following the appointment of a judge, a new election for that seat is scheduled in the next Spring election in which no other Appeals Court seat in that Appeals Court District is up for election, unless that election occurs less than five months from the date of the appointment.

Districts
 District I is chambered in Milwaukee and contains only Milwaukee County.
 District II is chambered in Waukesha and contains Calumet, Fond du Lac, Green Lake, Kenosha, Manitowoc, Ozaukee, Racine, Sheboygan, Walworth, Washington, Waukesha, and Winnebago counties.
 District III is chambered in Wausau and contains Ashland, Barron, Bayfield, Brown, Buffalo, Burnett, Chippewa, Door, Douglas, Dunn, Eau Claire, Florence, Forest, Iron, Kewaunee, Langlade, Lincoln, Marathon, Marinette, Menominee, Oconto, Oneida, Outagamie, Pepin, Pierce, Polk, Price, Rusk, Sawyer, Shawano, St. Croix, Taylor, Trempealeau, Vilas, and Washburn counties.
 District IV is chambered in Madison and contains Adams, Clark, Columbia, Crawford, Dane, Dodge, Grant, Green, Iowa, Jackson, Jefferson, Juneau, La Crosse, Lafayette, Marquette, Monroe, Portage, Richland, Rock, Sauk, Vernon, Waupaca, Waushara, and Wood counties.

Current judges

Judges

District I

District II

District III

District IV

See also 
Courts of Wisconsin

References

External links
About the Court of Appeals
Wisconsin Court of Appeals Operating Procedures
Court of Appeals Judges

State appellate courts of the United States
Wisconsin state courts
1978 establishments in Wisconsin
Courts and tribunals established in 1978